Goodland Township is a name shared by two townships in the United States:

Goodland Township, Michigan
Goodland Township, Itasca County, Minnesota

Township name disambiguation pages